The Pupilloideiis an taxonomic infraorder of air-breathing land snails, semislugs and slugs, terrestrial pulmonate gastropod molluscs in the suborder Helicina.

Superfamilies
 Azecoidea H. Watson, 1920
 Chondrinoidea Steenberg, 1925
 † Dendropupoidea Wenz, 1938 
 Pupilloidea W. Turton, 1831
Synonyms
 Achatinelloidea Gulick, 1873: synonym of Pupilloidea W. Turton, 1831
 Cochlicopoidea Pilsbry, 1900 (1879): synonym of Pupilloidea W. Turton, 1831
 Enoidea B. B. Woodward, 1903 (1880): synonym of Pupilloidea W. Turton, 1831
  Partuloidea Pilsbry, 1900: synonym of Pupilloidea W. Turton, 1831

References

 Bouchet P., Rocroi J.P., Hausdorf B., Kaim A., Kano Y., Nützel A., Parkhaev P., Schrödl M. & Strong E.E. (2017). Revised classification, nomenclator and typification of gastropod and monoplacophoran families. Malacologia. 61(1-2): 1-526

External links
 Saadi, A. J.; Mordan, P. B.; Wade, C. M. (2021). Molecular phylogeny of the Orthurethra (Panpulmonata: Stylommatophora). Zoological Journal of the Linnean Society.

Helicina (suborder)